Neil Wainwright (born 4 November 1977 in Warrington) is an English former footballer.

Wainwright played most of his football on the wing or in more recent times at full back. His former clubs include Wrexham, Sunderland and Darlington. He returned to Darlington on short term contract in February 2012 signing a short-term contract, before the club folded in the summer.

Career 
Wainwright began his career as a trainee at Wrexham in July 1996, making 11 league appearances in two season before joining Sunderland for a fee of £100,000 in July 1998. He made only two substitute appearances in the league and 6 in the League Cup for Sunderland before being loaned to Darlington in February 2000 for the rest of the 2000–01 season. He joined Halifax Town on loan in October 2000 for three months and then returned to Darlington on a permanent transfer for a fee of £50,000 in August 2001, where he made over 270 appearances in all competitions and was the club's player of the year in the 2006–07 season, but after making only six first-team appearances for Darlington at the start of the 2007–08 season he joined Shrewsbury Town on a one-month loan in October 2007. He later joined Mansfield Town in March 2008 until the end of the 2007–08 season but was recalled by Darlington a month later having made five appearances for Mansfield.

Following Darlington's failure to gain promotion from Football League Two in the 2007–08 season, Wainwright was one of several players surprisingly released by the club in May 2008. He joined Morecambe in June 2008 and excelled in a left wing-back role before his season was cut short by an achilles injury. In 2011, Wainwright was released by Morecambe. Wainwright scored once during his spell at the club; in a 3–1 defeat to Rotherham United.

On 28 February 2012, Wainwright re-signed for former club Darlington, who were in severe financial straits and battling relegation from the Conference National following a 10-point deduction for entering administration in December 2011. He had been playing for Kendal Town prior to his signing for Darlington; making his league debut on 27 September 2011 and scoring in a 3–3 draw with Marine, Wainwright would go on to play in 2 more league matches, alongside 7 cup appearances, before leaving Kendal in November 2011. Wainwright made his second Darlington debut on 3 March 2012, in a 0–1 home loss to Stockport County; he wore the number 26 shirt and was replaced by Clark Keltie in the 67th minute. He left the club in the summer of 2012 as the club were relegated and folded to reform as Darlington 1883 in the Northern Football League. For the start of the 2012–13 season Wainwright signed as a player for Northern Premier League club Lancaster City taking over as joint manager of the club in October 2012 before leaving in February 2013.

Career statistics

Honours

As a player 
Darlington
Division Three Play-off Final runner-up: 1999–00

References

External links

1977 births
Living people
English footballers
Wrexham A.F.C. players
Sunderland A.F.C. players
Halifax Town A.F.C. players
Darlington F.C. players
Shrewsbury Town F.C. players
Mansfield Town F.C. players
Morecambe F.C. players
Barrow A.F.C. players
Kendal Town F.C. players
English Football League players
National League (English football) players
Northern Premier League players
Lancaster City F.C. players
Association football midfielders
Lancaster City F.C. managers
English football managers
Morecambe F.C. non-playing staff